Marzolino Tarantola is the title character of an Italian comic series created by Bonvi.

The comics debuted in 1979, published in the magazines Il Corriere dei Piccoli and TV Sorrisi e Canzoni; at the same time a series of animation shorts was produced for the RAI TV-series Supergulp!.  The stories were later collected in two books published by editor Rizzoli Junior.
 
The comic consists in a zany parody of Albert Robida's Saturnin Farandoul mixed with elements of the film The Great Race starring Jack Lemmon and Tony Curtis. It tells of Marzolino Tarantola, an adventurous, snob nobleman of British origins who takes part to the San Francisco-Paris car rally  accompanied by the faithful butler Alfred and by Enrico l'Equipaggio (Henry the crew), a hulking speech-impaired man that solves any kind of problem.

References 

Italian comics characters
Comics characters introduced in 1979
1979 comics debuts
Italian comic strips
Italian comics titles
Humor comics
Parody comics
Parodies of comics
Fictional nobility
Fictional British people